The Other Side of the Mirror may refer to:
The Other Side of the Mirror (album), an album by Stevie Nicks
The Other Side of the Mirror (film), a film by Murray Lerner; also known as The Other Side of the Mirror: Bob Dylan at the Newport Folk Festival
The Other Side of the Mirror (manhua), a comic by Jo Chen
The Other Side of the Mirror (anthology), an anthology of stories set in Marion Zimmer Bradley's Darkover universe